Ponting is a surname. Notable people with the name include:

Charles Ponting (1850–1932), English architect
Chris Ponting, British biologist
Clive Ponting (1946–2020), UK civil servant and writer
Herbert Ponting (1870–1935), British photographer
Nick Ponting, British badminton player
Ricky Ponting (born 1974), former Australian cricket player and captain
Thomas Ponting, British entrepreneur, founder of Pontings department store
Tom Ponting (born 1965), Canadian swimmer
Walter Ponting (1913–1960), English footballer
William Ponting (1872–1952), English footballer 

English-language surnames